Theodore Davie (March 22, 1852 in Brixton, London – March 7, 1898 in Victoria, British Columbia) was a British Columbia lawyer, politician, and jurist. He practised law in Cassiar and Nanaimo before settling in Victoria and becoming a leading criminal lawyer. He was the brother of Alexander Edmund Batson Davie, who served as premier of British Columbia from 1887 to 1889. Theodore Davie was first elected to the provincial legislature in 1882. In 1889, he became attorney-general under Premier John Robson, and succeeded Robson as premier in 1892.

Davie's government passed a Redistribution Bill to give the mainland of the province greater representation in the legislature. His government also provided financial incentives to the railways in an effort to stimulate the economy. The Davie government also approved the construction of the province's parliament buildings in Victoria despite pressure to move the capital to the mainland.

Davie served as premier until 1895 when he resigned to become Chief Justice of the Supreme Court of British Columbia succeeding the province's first Chief Justice, Sir Matthew Baillie Begbie.

Theodore Davie is interred in the Ross Bay Cemetery in Victoria, British Columbia.

References 
Biography at the Dictionary of Canadian Biography Online
Encyclopedia of British Columbia

1852 births
1898 deaths
Premiers of British Columbia
Judges in British Columbia
English emigrants to pre-Confederation British Columbia
People from Brixton
Attorneys General of British Columbia
Lawyers in British Columbia